Robert Tripp Ross (June 4, 1903 – October 1, 1981) was an American politician from New York. He served in two non-consecutive terms to the United States House of Representatives and an assistant Secretary of Defense.

Early life
Born in Washington, Beaufort County, North Carolina and attended the public schools there and attended Northeastern University. Later, he tried several professions including real estate investment in Florida, advertising sales in Florida and Texas, and auto sales in North Carolina. He moved to New York City in 1929, and engaged as a druggist. He took a job at a pharmacy in Queens where he became the manager. By 1946, he was an assistant to the president of a drug company

Political career
In 1946, Ross ran for a seat in Congress from New York's 5th congressional district. Normally, a Democratic district, Ross won election as one of 55 Republicans who swept to victory in the 1946 elections. His time in Congress was short as T. Vincent Quinn ousted him in 1948 and again in 1950. From 1949 until 1952, he was a director of sales and marketing for the Southern Athletic Company, which was owned by his brother-in-law.

At the end of 1951, Quinn resigned his seat in Congress to become the Queens County District Attorney and Ross won the February 1952 special election replace him. Ross was defeated in the general election in 1952 to Lester Holtzman.

Defense Department
After his defeat, Ross became the Washington liaison for the New York Republican State Committee. Later, he worked for Assistant Secretary of Defense for Legislative Affairs, Fred A. Seaton. When Seaton left to work as an assistant to President Dwight Eisenhower in 1955, Ross was appointed to Seaton’s position.

Ross’ initial months in the post were tumultuous. Ross, acting on a directive from Secretary of Defense, Charles E. Wilson to ensure that all releases made a “constructive contribution” to national defense. Congressional committees and reporters charged him with censorship when he made significant edits to speeches by staffers, service secretaries and the Joint Chiefs of Staff. A congressional subcommittee found that the Department of Defense’s policies were the most restrictive of any agency.

He also incorrectly confirmed a 1956 report that three senators including, John L. McClellan, had requested the Air Force to send a pair of planes to Europe for them. The Defense department ultimately apologized to the senators for the slip-up.

In January 1957, Ross took a leave of absence in response to a congressional investigation into possible conflicts of interest involving a clothing business run by his wife and owned by his brother-in-law. The subcommittee, headed by Senator McClellan, looked into an $835,150 contract for Army trousers that was awarded to Wynn Enterprises. The Senators also looked into an allegation that Ross set up a meeting for his brother-in-law with an army officer to ostensibly discuss clothes procured under another defense contract. The committee also looked into information that Ross was still affiliated with the company, despite assurances that he severed all ties.

Ross denied all the allegations and an investigation by the Defense Department found no violations of the law and no improper use of influence. Nevertheless, Ross concluded that the charges would affect his ability to serve and resigned in February 1957.

Later career
After leaving the Defense Department, he worked as an assistant borough works commissioner in Queens, New York from March 1957 to January 1958 and vice president, Merchandising Apparel Company, from 1959 to 1968.

Personal life
Ross married twice. He had two sons, Robert, Jr. and Ford, from his first marriage, which ended in divorce. His second wife was Claire (Wynn) Ross. He resided in Jackson Heights until his death there on October 1, 1981; interment was at Oakdale Cemetery in Washington, North Carolina.

References

External links

 

1903 births
1981 deaths
People from Jackson Heights, Queens
People from Washington, North Carolina
Republican Party members of the United States House of Representatives from New York (state)
20th-century American politicians